Brétigny-sur-Orge (literally Brétigny on Orge) is a commune in the southern suburbs of Paris, France,  from the city center.

Origin of the city name

The name of the settlement is attested as Britiniacum in 1146, as Bretigniacum in 1548, and subsequently as Breteigny.

The origins of Brétigny start in the era of Roman Gaul. The etymology comes from the Latin britiniacum, which means "property of the Breton". The name certifies that this territory was during that period dedicated to a Breton, coming from (Great) Britain, during the period of Briton migration (6th century). Brétigny afterwards belonged to the royal estate of the Merovingian kings (from the 5th century until the 8th century).

At the time of the creation of the commune, the city name was spelled without any accent. This accent was added in 1801, and the name of the river ("on Orge") was added in 1898.

Geography

Climate

Brétigny-sur-Orge has a oceanic climate (Köppen climate classification Cfb).

Transport
It is served by Brétigny station on Paris RER line C.

On 12 July 2013 an intercity train derailed shortly after 17.00, killing at least 6 people.

People
Inhabitants of Brétigny-sur-Orge are known as Brétignolais.

Notable Brétignolais include:
Cédric Collet, footballer, was born in Brétigny. He has played for the Guadeloupe national football team.
Cédric Baseya, footballer, was born in Brétigny. He has played for Le Havre AC and some English clubs, but is now a free agent.
Antoine-Gaspard Boucher d'Argis, (1708-1791), lawyer and encyclopedist, lived in Brétigny in the Castle of la Fontaine.
Jean de Boishue (1943- ), politician. He was mayor of Brétigny.
Patrice Évra, football player, played for CS Brétigny from 1993 to 1997.
Jérémy Ménez, football player, played for CS Brétigny from 2000 to 2001.

References

External links

Official website 

Mayors of Essonne Association 

Communes of Essonne